Karoliina Stina Margaretha "Karo" Rantamäki (born 23 February 1978) is a Finnish ice hockey forward and captain of Stadin Gimmat (HIFK Naiset) of the Naisten Liiga (NSML), the premier women's ice hockey league in Finland. She holds the all-time career record for games played with the Finnish women's national ice hockey team, having played in 256 top level international matches.

She represented Finland at five Olympic Games and won bronze medals in the women's ice hockey tournaments in 1998 and 2010. She has also represented Finland at thirteen IIHF World Women's Championships and has earned eight World Championship bronze medals (1997, 1999, 2000, 2004, 2008, 2009, 2011, 2015). Rantamäki has played with national championship winning teams in both the Naisten Liiga in Finland and the Zhenskaya Hockey League (ZhHL) in Russia and its predecessor, the Russian Women's Hockey League.

The Finnish Ice Hockey Association trophy for Most Valuable Player of the Naisten Liiga playoffs was renamed the Karoliina Rantamäki Award in the 2010–11 season and continues to be awarded seasonally.

Playing career
Rantamäki also played for Finland at the 2010 Winter Olympics, and won a second bronze medal. She also won a bronze medal at the 2010 Four Nations Cup in St. John's, Newfoundland. She scored at 2:49 overtime to give Finland the bronze medal at the 2011 IIHF Women's World Championship. In addition, she played for SKIF Nizhny Novgorod.

Career statistics

References

External links 
 
 
 

1978 births
Living people
Espoo Blues Naiset players
Finnish women's ice hockey forwards
HIFK Naiset players
Ice hockey players at the 1998 Winter Olympics
Ice hockey players at the 2002 Winter Olympics
Ice hockey players at the 2006 Winter Olympics
Ice hockey players at the 2010 Winter Olympics
Ice hockey players at the 2014 Winter Olympics
Medalists at the 1998 Winter Olympics
Medalists at the 2010 Winter Olympics
Naisten Liiga All-Stars
Olympic bronze medalists for Finland
Olympic ice hockey players of Finland
Olympic medalists in ice hockey
Finnish expatriate ice hockey players in Russia
HC SKIF players
Sportspeople from Espoo